Mark Gregory Burton was the Anglican Dean of Melbourne from 2009 to 2012.

A former nurse and Iraq War veteran, he was a curate in Werribee, chaplain to Archbishop Keith Rayner and the incumbent at Glen Iris. Prior to serving as Dean of Melbourne, he had been an assistant bishop in the Diocese of Perth since 2006.

References

Assistant bishops in the Anglican Diocese of Perth
Australian nurses
Deans of Melbourne
21st-century Anglican bishops in Australia
Living people
Year of birth missing (living people)